Munti Wasi (Ancash Quechua munti tree, Quechua wasi house, "tree house", also spelled Monte Huasi) is a  mountain in the Andes of Peru. It is located in the Huánuco Region, Huánuco Province, on the border of the districts of Cayrán and Chaulán. It lies northeast of the mountains named Qiwllaqucha and Yawarqucha.

References

Mountains of Peru
Mountains of Huánuco Region